Saint-Geniès-Bellevue is a commune in the Haute-Garonne department in southeast France.

Population
The inhabitants of the commune are called Saint-Geniessois in French.

See also
Communes of the Haute-Garonne department

References

Communes of Haute-Garonne